Vincent Fajks Airstrip  is an airstrip serving Paloemeu, Suriname. The airport was constructed as part of Operation Grasshopper. It was named after the Polish pilot Vincent Fajks who crashed with co-pilot Ronald Kappel with their  Aero Commander AC 520 (PZ-TAG) airplane at the site in October 1959, while trying to deliver building materials for the airport. They both received a state funeral in Paramaribo on 11 October 1959. There is a jungle resort on the Tapanahony River near Paloemeu.

Charters and destinations 
Charter Airlines serving this airport are:

See also

 List of airports in Suriname
 Transport in Suriname

References

External links
OpenStreetMap - Vincent Fayks
Vincent Fayks Airport
Google Maps - Vincent Fayks

Airports in Suriname
Sipaliwini District